Lindbergella is a genus of plants in the grass family, found only on the Island of Cyprus in the Mediterranean. The only known species is Lindbergella sintenisii.

References

Pooideae
Monotypic Poaceae genera
Endemic flora of Cyprus